The Visayan miniature babbler (Micromacronus leytensis) is a bird species in the family Cisticolidae. It was for a long time the only member of the genus Micromacronus, but the Mindanao miniature babbler, formerly included in M. leytensis as a subspecies, is now usually held to be a distinct species, M. sordidus.

M. leytensis is endemic to the Philippines. Its natural habitats are subtropical or tropical moist lowland forest and subtropical or tropical moist montane forest. Its status is insufficiently known.

References
Notes

Sources
 Collar, N.J. & Robson, C. (2007): Family Timaliidae (Babblers). In: del Hoyo, Josep; Elliott, Andrew & Christie, D.A. (eds.): Handbook of Birds of the World, Volume 12 (Picathartes to Tits and Chickadees): 70-291. Lynx Edicions, Barcelona.

Visayan miniature babbler
Fauna of the Visayas
Visayan miniature babbler
Visayan miniature babbler
Taxonomy articles created by Polbot